This is a list of members of the Irish House of Commons between 1783 and 1790. There were 300 MPs at a time in this period.

References
 
 

783